Nebracetam is an investigational drug of the racetam family that is a M1 acetylcholine receptor agonist in rats.  Its effects in humans have not been studied.

See also 
 Piracetam
 Aniracetam
 Racetam

References 

Racetams
Amines
Experimental drugs